Swan For The Money is an album by the Old Swan Band.

Track listing 

 "The Green-Clad Hills/ Jimmy Garson's March" (Trad/ Trad)
 A tune collected in Orkney by Peter Kennedy, and one from England
 "Mrs O'Dwyer's / Packie Russell's" (Trad. arr. OSB / Trad. arr. OSB)
 "The Queen's Jig / The Basque"  (Trad. arr. OSB / Trad. arr. OSB)
 "Walter Bulwer's No. 2 & 1" (Trad. arr. OSB / Trad. arr. OSB)
 "Staffordshire Hornpipe / Mad Moll of the Cheshire Hunts" (Trad. arr. OSB / Trad. arr. OSB)
 "Dashing White Sergeant / Brighton Camp" (Bishop arr. OSB / Trad. arr. OSB)
 "The Woodcutters Jig/ The Swedish Dance" (Headford / Trad. arr. OSB)
 "Gloucester Hornpipe / Polly Put The Kettle On" (Trad. arr. OSB / Trad. arr. OSB)
 "The Sloe / The Sweet Briar / Double Figure 8" (all Trad. arr. OSB)
 "The Vine Tree / the Gentiane Mazurka" (Burgess / Trad. arr. OSB)
 "Earl of Mansfield / Bobby Shaftoe" (McEwan arr. OSB / Trad. arr. OSB)
 "In & Out the Windows / Down the Road" (Trad. arr. OSB / Trad. arr. OSB)
 "Les Jigs - The Matelot / Michael Turner's Jig / Captain Lanoe's Quick March" (All Trad. arr. OSB)
 "The Rose / J B Milne" (Trad. arr. OSB / Fitchet)
 "Grand Chain / Grommet" (Trad. arr. OSB / Freya)

Personnel 

 John Adams (trombone, fiddle)
 Martin Brinsford (percussion, mouth organ)
 Paul Burgess (fiddle)
 Fi Fraser (fiddle)
 Jo Freya (tenor saxophone, whistle)
 Neil Gledhill (bass saxophone)
 Flos Headford (fiddle)
 Heather Horsley (keyboard)

Old Swan Band albums
2011 albums